The 1966 AFC Youth Championship was held in Manila, Philippines from 30 April to 15 May 1966.

Teams

Tournament

Group stage

Group A

Group B

Group C

Quarter-final berth play-off

Knockout stage

Quarter-finals

Semi-finals

Third place play-off

Final

Notes

References 
Jönsson, Mikael, "Asian U-19 Championship 1966". RSSSF

Youth Championship, 1966
AFC U-19 Championship
International association football competitions hosted by the Philippines
Afc Youth Championship, 1966
AFC
1966 in youth association football